is the first live album released by Number Girl in 1999, performed at Shibuya Club Quattro.

Tracks 
 "Eight Beater"
 "Iggy Pop Fan Club"
 
 
 "Young Girl Seventeen Sexually Knowing"
 
 
 "Destruction Baby"
 
 
 "Super Young"
 "Omoide in My Head"

1999 live albums